The 2023 CCAA/Curling Canada College Championships were held from March 15 to 19 at the Gerry McCrory Countryside Sports Complex in Sudbury, Ontario. The event was hosted by Laurentian University. Sudbury was originally scheduled to host the 2022 edition of the event, however, it was cancelled due to the COVID-19 pandemic in Ontario. The event was held in conjunction with the 2023 U Sports/Curling Canada University Curling Championships, the Canadian university curling championship.

Men

Teams
The teams are listed as follows:

Round robin standings
Final Round Robin Standings

Round robin results
All draws are listed in Eastern Time (UTC−04:00).

Draw 2
Wednesday, March 15, 9:30 pm

Draw 4
Thursday, March 16, 12:30 pm

Draw 6
Thursday, March 16, 8:30 pm

Draw 8
Friday, March 17, 12:30 pm

Draw 10
Friday, March 17, 8:30 pm

Draw 11
Saturday, March 18, 8:30 am

Draw 13
Saturday, March 18, 4:30 pm

Playoffs

Semifinals
Sunday, March 19, 9:30 am

Bronze medal game
Sunday, March 19, 2:30 pm

Final
Sunday, March 19, 2:30 pm

Final standings

Women

Teams
The teams are listed as follows:

Round robin standings
Final Round Robin Standings

Round robin results
All draws are listed in Eastern Time (UTC−04:00).

Draw 1
Wednesday, March 15, 5:30 pm

Draw 3
Thursday, March 16, 8:30 am

Draw 5
Thursday, March 16, 4:30 pm

Draw 7
Friday, March 17, 8:30 am

Draw 9
Friday, March 17, 4:30 pm

Draw 12
Saturday, March 18, 12:30 pm

Draw 14
Saturday, March 18, 8:30 pm

Playoffs

Semifinals
Sunday, March 19, 9:30 am

Bronze medal game
Sunday, March 19, 2:30 pm

Final
Sunday, March 19, 2:30 pm

Final standings

References

External links

Curling competitions in Greater Sudbury
March 2023 sports events in Canada
CCAA/Curling Canada Championships
CCAA/Curling Canada Championships